Juhor ad-Dik is a Palestinian village in the Gaza Governorate, south of Gaza City, in the central Gaza Strip. According to the Palestinian Central Bureau of Statistics (PCBS), the village had a population of 3,200 inhabitants in 2006. In the 1997 census by the PCBS, Palestinian refugees made up 72.3% of the population which at the time was 2,275.

Thirteen residents, including at least two children were killed and 18 others wounded, some seriously, when Israeli tanks fired on a mosque and two houses at the village on April 16, 2008. During Israel's invasion of the Gaza Strip in 2008-09,  Israeli troops and Palestinian militiamen battled frequently in Juhor ad-Dik.

References

Villages in the Gaza Strip
Municipalities of the State of Palestine